The Burchardi flood (also known as the second Grote Mandrenke) was a storm tide that struck the North Sea coast of North Frisia and Dithmarschen (in modern-day Germany) on the night between 11 and 12 October 1634. Overrunning dikes, it shattered the coastline and caused thousands of deaths (8,000 to 15,000 people drowned) and catastrophic material damage. Much of the island of Strand washed away, forming the islands Nordstrand, Pellworm and several halligen.

Background
The Burchardi flood hit Schleswig-Holstein during a period of economic weakness. In 1603 a plague epidemic spread across the land, killing many. The flooding occurred during the Thirty Years' War, which also did not spare Schleswig-Holstein. Fighting had occurred between locals and the troops of Frederick III, Duke of Holstein-Gottorp, especially on Strand Island. The people of Strand were resisting changes to their old defence treaties and the forced accommodation of troops. Supported by a Danish expeditionary fleet, they succeeded in repulsing first an imperial army and later the duke's men, but were eventually defeated in 1629. The island and subsequently also the means of coastal protection suffered from the strife.

The Burchardi flood was merely the last in a series of floods that hit the coastline of Schleswig-Holstein in that period. In 1625, great ice-floats had already caused major damage to the dikes. Several storm floods are reported by the chronicles during the years prior to 1634; the fact that the dikes did not hold even during summer provides evidence for their insufficient maintenance.

Course of events
While the weather had been calm for weeks prior to the flood, a strong storm occurred from the east on the evening of 11 October 1634 which turned southwest during the evening and developed into a European windstorm from the northwest. The most comprehensive report is preserved from Dutch hydraulic engineer Jan Leeghwater who was tasked with land reclamation in a part of the Dagebüll bay. He writes:

Leeghwater and his son fled over the dike towards a manor which was situated on higher terrain while the water had almost reached the top of the dike. At the time there were 38 persons in that manor, 20 of whom were refugees from lower lands. He continues:

The witness Peter Sax from Koldenbüttel described the scenario as follows:

In combination with half a spring tide, the wind was pushing the water against the coastline with such a force that the first dike broke in the Stintebüll parish on Strand island at 10 p.m. About two hours past midnight the water had reached its peak level.

The water rose so high that not only were the dikes destroyed but also houses in the shallow marshlands and even those on artificial dwelling hills were flooded. Some houses collapsed while others were set on fire due to unattended fireplaces.

Direct consequences

In this night the dikes broke at several hundred locations along the North Sea coastline of Schleswig-Holstein. Estimations of fatalities range from 8,000 to 15,000. 8,000 local victims are counted by contemporary sources and from comparisons of parish registers. The actual number is likely to be much higher, though, because according to Anton Heimreich's Nordfriesische Chronik "many alien threshers and working people had been in the land whose number could just not be accounted for with certainty."

On Strand alone at least 6,123 people (or 2/3 of the entire population of the island) and 50,000 livestock lost their lives due to 44 dike breaches. The water destroyed 1,300 houses and 30 mills. All 21 churches on Strand were heavily damaged, 17 of which were completely destroyed. Almost the entire new harvest was lost. And the island of Strand was torn apart, forming the smaller islands Nordstrand and Pellworm and the halligen Südfall and Nordstrandischmoor. The Nübbel and Nieland halligen were submerged in the sea.

On the Eiderstedt peninsula, 2,107 people and 12,802 livestock drowned and 664 houses were destroyed by the flood according to Heimreich's chronicle. Heimreich counts 383 dead in Dithmarschen. 168 people died, 1,360 livestock were lost, and 102 houses "drifted away" died in Busen parish (today's Büsum) and the areas along the mouth of the river Eider. Numerous people were killed in the coastal marshlands and victims were recorded even in settlements in the back-country like Bargum, Breklum, Almdorf or Bohmstedt. Even in Hamburg dikes broke in the Hammerbrook and Wilhelmsburg quarters. In Lower-Saxony, the dike of Hove broke at a length of 900 m.

The ambitious project by the Dukes of Gottorp to shut off the bay of Dagebüll, today's Bökingharde, with one single, large dike, which had been progressing after ten years of hard work, was now finally destroyed by the flood. Fagebüll and Fahretoft (which were still halligen back then) suffered great losses of land and lives. The church of Ockholm was destroyed and the sea dike had to be relocated landwards.

Long-term effects

The Burchardi flood had especially severe consequences for Strand island where large parts of the land were lying below sea level. For weeks and months after the flood the water did not run off. Due to tidal currents the size of the dike breaches increased and several dike lines were eventually completely washed into the sea. This meant that a lot of arable land which had still been worked on directly after the flood had to be abandoned in later times because it could not be kept against the intruding sea. Saline sea water frequently submerged the fields of Strand so that they could no longer be used for agriculture.

M. Löbedanz, the preacher of Gaikebüll, describes the situation on Nordstrand after the flood:

In cultural terms, the Old Nordstrand variety of the North Frisian language was lost. The number of victims who spoke the idiom was too high and moreover many islanders moved their homes to the mainland or the higher hallig Nordstrandischmoor – against the order of Duke Frederick III.

By 1637 dikes on Pellworm were restored for 1,800 hectares of land. On Nordstrand however, the remaining farmers lived on dwelling hills like the hallig people and were hardly able to cultivate their fields. Despite several orders by the Duke, they failed in restoring the dikes. According to the Nordstrand dike law, those who could not secure land against the sea with dikes forfeit it. Finally the Duke enforced the Frisian law of De nich will dieken, de mutt wieken (Low German:"Who does not want to build a dike, shall lose ground"), expropriated the locals and attracted foreign settlers with a charter that promised land and considerable privileges to investors in dikes, like the sovereignty of policing and justice. One such investor was the Dutch entrepreneur Quirinus Indervelden who managed to create the first new polder in 1654 with Dutch money and expert workers from Brabant. Other polders followed in 1657 and 1663. This Dutch settlement is still present today in form of an Old Catholic churchhouse. The Old Catholic Dutchmen had been allowed to practise their religion in Lutheran Denmark and to erect their own church. Until 1870 the preacher there used to hold the sermon in Dutch.

In the course of further land reclamation, both islands Pellworm and Nordstrand today have a total area of ca. 9,000 hectares which is one third of old Strand island. Between the islands, the Norderhever tidal channel was formed which has gained up to 30 m of depth during the last 370 years. It has frequently been a threat to the geological foundations of Pellworm.

Contemporary reaction
The people of the time could only imagine such a flood as a divine punishment from God. The evangelical enthusiast and poet Anna Ovena Hoyer interpreted the Burchardi Flood as the beginning of the apocalypse.

References
Citations

Works cited

General references

External links
Changing coastline of Nordfriesland (Page in German). Shows maps of the coastline as changed during the last 1000 years
Cor Snabel's "Flood of the Nordstrand Island, 1634"  A rich resource including the eyewitness account of the hydraulic engineer Jan Leeghwater.

Floods in Germany
1634 natural disasters
1634 in Europe
1634 in the Holy Roman Empire
17th-century meteorology
European windstorms
Storm tides of the North Sea
17th-century floods